Ordination is the process by which individuals are consecrated, that is, set apart as clergy to perform various religious rites and ceremonies such as celebrating the sacraments. The process and ceremonies of ordination varies by denomination. One who is in preparation for, or who is undergoing the process of ordination is sometimes called an ordinand. The liturgy used at an ordination is sometimes referred to as an ordinal.

Ordination of women has been taking place in an increasing number of Protestant churches during the 20th century.

While ordination of women has been approved in many denominations over the past half century, it is still a very controversial and divisive topic.

Overview of the theological debate
Most (although not all) Protestant denominations ordain church leaders who have the task of equipping all believers in their Christian service. These leaders (variously styled elders, pastors, or ministers) are seen to have a distinct role in teaching, pastoral leadership.

Protestant churches have historically viewed the Bible as the ultimate authority in church debates (the doctrine of sola scriptura); as such, the debate over women's eligibility for such offices normally centers around the interpretation of certain Biblical passages relating to teaching and leadership roles.

Increasingly however, supporters of women in ministry argue that the Biblical passages used to argue against women's ordination might be read differently when more understanding of the unique historical context of each passage is available. Often quoting ,they argue that the good news brought by Jesus has broken down all barriers and that female ordination is an equality issue that Jesus would have approved of. They also quote , and argue that in talking to Mary, Jesus is calling for women to evangelize

In turn, those who argue for a male only ministry will say that the claims to contexts that change the apparent meaning of the texts at hand to one supporting female ordination are in fact spurious, that the passages that appear to show women in positions of authority do not in fact do so and the idea that the good news of Jesus brings equality before God only relates to salvation and not to roles for ministry.

By tradition

Anabaptist 
Brethren

 The Church of the Brethren has ordained women since 1958.

Mennonite 
 The Canadian Conference of Mennonite Brethren Churches' has ordained women.
 The Mennonite Church Canada ordains women.
 The Mennonite Brethren Church does not ordain women to be lead pastors.
 The Mennonite Church USA ordains women.
 The Brethren in Christ Church ordains women at all levels of leadership, including Bishop.

Anglican 

The ordination of women in the Anglican Communion has been increasingly common in certain provinces since the 1970s. However, several provinces (such as the Church of Pakistan—a united Protestant Church created as a result of a union between Anglicans, Lutherans, Methodists and Presbyterians) and certain dioceses within otherwise ordaining provinces (such as the Diocese of Sydney in the Anglican Church of Australia), continue to ordain only men. Disputes over the ordination of women have contributed to the establishment and growth of conservative separatist tendencies, such the Anglican realignment and Continuing Anglican movements.

Some provinces within the Anglican Communion, such as the Protestant Episcopal Church in the United States of America, ordain women to the three traditional holy orders of bishop, priest and deacon. Other provinces ordain women as deacons and priests but not as bishops; others still as deacons only; and seven provinces do not approve the ordination of women to any order of ministry.

Baptist 
The very diverse organizations which employ the term Baptist in self-designation:
 The Baptist organizations in Germany and Switzerland (Bund Evangelisch-Freikirchlicher Gemeinden, Bund Schweizer Baptistengemeinden) ordain women.
 The Southern Baptist Convention (the largest of the various Baptist denominations) does not support the ordination of women; however, some churches that are members of the SBC have ordained women.  Though each SBC church is autonomous and may choose whether or not to ordain women, the local associations and state conventions have the right to not seat messengers from those churches at the annual meetings, and some have done so.
 Baptist groups in the United States that ordain women include American Baptist Churches USA, Alliance of Baptists, Cooperative Baptist Fellowship (CBF), Missionary Baptist Conference, USA, National Baptist Convention, USA, Inc. and Progressive National Baptist Convention.
The General Association of Baptists (mostly United States) (some would call these General Baptists, or Arminian Baptists) ordain women.
 The Okinawa Baptist Convention, Japan ordains women to be Pastors of the church.
 The General Association of Regular Baptist Churches does not ordain women.
The Baptist Union of Great Britain ordains women.
The Baptist Federation of Canada which includes the Canadian Baptists of Western Canada (CBWC), the Canadian Baptists of Ontario and Quebec (CBOQ), and the Canadian Baptists of Atlantic Canada (CBAC) ordains women.
 The state associations of Victoria, South Australia and New South Wales in the Baptist Union of Australia ordain women

Lutheran

Europe 
 The Lutheran churches within the Evangelical Church in Germany (EKD) ordain women and have women as bishops.
 The Independent Evangelical-Lutheran Church in Germany does not ordain women.
 The Evangelical Lutheran Church of Latvia reversed its earlier (1975) decision to ordain women as pastors. Since 1993 it no longer does so in practice. Since 2016 this principle has been affirmed in its constitution.
 The Lutheran state churches in the Nordic countries ordain women as pastors and have women as bishops. The first female pastors were ordained in the Church of Denmark in 1948, in Sweden in 1960, Norway in 1961, in Iceland in 1974 and in Finland in 1988.
 While the Church of Sweden ordained its first female pastors in 1960, there was a considerable debate in this church of the ordination of women, which led to marginalization of a vocal high-church minority, which successively subdivided into loyalist high-church adherents on one hand and the splinter group Missionsprovinsen which was formed in 2003 but in 2005 was separated as a church body from the Church of Sweden.
Although the ordination of women was accepted by the Church of Finland in 1988, controversy over the issue occasionally surfaces among the more conservative wing of the church. Occasional debate on the matter has caused church membership resignations. 
 The Estonian Evangelical Lutheran Church (EELC) began to ordain women in 1967 and 2004 all obstacles that forbade women to be consecrated as bishops were removed although none have yet been consecrated.
 The Evangelical Church of the Augsburg Confession in Poland  ordains women as pastors since 2022. 9 pastors are women.
 The Evangelical Church of the Augsburg Confession in Slovakia ordains women as pastors since 1951 and women can be elected bishops.
 The Slovak Evangelical Church of the Augsburg Confession in Serbia ordains women as pastors. Out of 20 pastors in Serbia, 6 are women.

United States 
 The Evangelical Lutheran Church in America (ELCA) is the largest Lutheran body in the USA. The church bodies that formed the ELCA in 1988 began ordaining women in 1970 when the Lutheran Church in America ordained Elizabeth Platz.  In 2017 about 27% of the rostered leaders were women and about 50% of the seminarians preparing for ministry were women. In 2013 the first female presiding bishop of the ELCA, Elizabeth Eaton, was elected.  In 2018 16 of the 65 synodical bishops (17 bishops including Presiding Bishop Eaton) in the ELCA were women 
 The General Lutheran Church ordains women.
 The Lutheran Church–Missouri Synod (LCMS), which is the second largest Lutheran body in the United States, does not ordain women.
The Lutheran Congregations in Mission for Christ (LCMC) also allows for the ordination of women.
The North American Lutheran Church, was founded in 2010 does ordain women.  The NALC has established ecumenical dialog with a number of Lutheran bodies, both those that ordain women and those that do not. 
 The Wisconsin Evangelical Lutheran Synod does not ordain women.
 The Evangelical Lutheran Synod does not ordain women.
 The Church of the Lutheran Confession does not ordain women.
 The Lutheran Evangelical Protestant Church (GCEPC) has ordained women since its inception in 2000. Ordination of women is not a controversial issue in the LEPC/GCEPC. Women are ordained/consecrated at all levels, including deacon, priest, and bishop in the LEPC/GCEPC.

Africa 
 The Evangelical Lutheran Church in Tanzania (ELCT) decided to ordain women in 1990, but does not have any women bishops. Some dioceses are still opposed to the ordination of women.
 The Ethiopian Evangelical Church Mekane Yesus (EECMY) began to ordain women in 2000 but doesn't continue this practice since confessional lutheranism has become stronger in this church body during recent years.

Methodist

 The United Methodist Church ordains women. In 1880, Anna Howard Shaw was ordained by the Methodist Protestant Church; Ella Niswonger was ordained in 1889 by the United Brethren Church. Both denominations later merged into the United Methodist Church. In 1956, the Methodist Church in America granted ordination and full clergy rights to women. Since that time, women have been ordained full elders (pastors) in the denomination, and 21 have been elevated to the episcopacy. In 1967 Noemi Diaz is the first Hispanic woman ordained by an Annual Conference. The New York Annual Conference did the honors. The first woman elected and consecrated Bishop within the United Methodist Church (and, indeed, the first woman elected bishop of any mainline Christian church) was Marjorie Matthews in 1980. Leontine T. Kelly, in 1984, was the first African-American woman elevated to the episcopacy in any mainline denomination. In Germany Rosemarie Wenner is since 2005 leading bishop in the United Methodist Church. Bishop Karen Oliveto, currently serving, is the first openly lesbian bishop in The United Methodist Church.
 The Primitive Methodist Church does not ordain women as elders nor does it license them as pastors or local preachers; the PMC does consecrate women as deaconesses.
 The Evangelical Wesleyan Church (EWC) does not ordain women as elders although it does commission women as deaconesses. 
 The Fundamental Methodist Conference does not ordain women.
 The Southern Methodist Church does not ordain women.
 The Free Methodist Church has ordained women since 1911.
 The Bible Methodist Connection of Churches ordains women.
 The Salvation Army ordains women and has done since its inception.  Catherine Booth was co-founder, with her husband William.
 The Church of the Nazarene ordains women, with the first women being ordained since 1908.
 The Wesleyan Methodist Church (which is now the Allegheny Wesleyan Methodist Connection and Wesleyan Church) has ordained women as ministers since near its inception, and claims to be one of the first to ordain women in the modern era.

Pentecostal
 The Pentecostal church in Germany allows ordination of women.
 The Pentecostal church in Sweden allows ordination of women.
 The Pentecostal Mission does not ordain women pastors.
 The occurrence of women pastors, often as co-pastors along with their husbands, is frequent in the Pentecostal movement especially in churches not affiliated with a denomination; they may or may not be ordained.  Notable women pastors include Paula White and Victoria Osteen.
 The Assemblies of God USA do ordain women and have women in leadership throughout the Church.
 Church of God in Christ (COGIC) does not ordain women as elder or bishop

Presbyterian, United or Reformed

Scotland 

 The Church of Scotland
 Women were commissioned as deacons from 1935, and allowed to preach from 1949.
 In 1963 Mary Levison petitioned the General Assembly for ordination.
 Woman elders were introduced in 1966 and women ministers in 1968.
 The first female Moderator of the General Assembly was Dr Alison Elliot in 2004.

 The United Free Church of Scotland has ordained women since 1929 and elected its first female general assembly moderator in 1960.
 The Free Church of Scotland does not ordain women. 
 The Free Church of Scotland (Continuing) does not ordain women.
 The Free Presbyterian Church of Scotland based in Scotland, Australia and Zimbabwe does not ordain women. 
 The Associated Presbyterian Churches based in Scotland does not ordain women.

England/Wales 

 The United Reformed Church in the United Kingdom ordains women.
 The International Presbyterian Church based in the UK, Europe, and Korea does not ordain women. 
 The Evangelical Presbyterian Church in England and Wales does not ordain women. 
 The Free Church of England does not ordain women.
 The Presbyterian Church of Wales ordains women.

Ireland 

 The Presbyterian Church in Ireland does ordain women.
 The Non-subscribing Presbyterian Church of Ireland ordains women. 
 The Free Presbyterian Church of Ulster does not ordain women.
 The Evangelical Presbyterian Church (Ireland) does not ordain women.
 The Reformed Presbyterian Church of Ireland does not ordain women.

Netherlands 
 The Dutch Reformed Church does ordain women except the reformed union
 The Reformed Churches in the Netherlands (Liberated) does not ordain women.
 The Reformed Congregations in the Netherlands does not ordain women.

Belgium 
 The United Protestant Church in Belgium does ordain women.

Luxembourg 
 The Protestant Reformed Church of Luxembourg does ordain women. 
 The Protestant Church of Luxembourg does ordain women.

France 
 The Reformed Church of France ordains women.
The United Protestant Church of France ordains women.

Switzerland 
 The Swiss Reformed Church does ordain women.

Germany 
 The united and reformed churches within the Evangelical Church in Germany (EKD) ordain women and have women as bishops.

Eastern Europe 
 The Reformed Church in Hungary ordains women.
 The Polish Reformed Church ordains women since 2003.

North America 
 The Presbyterian Church (USA). The PC(USA) was formed in 1983 by a merger of the Presbyterian Church in the United States (PCUS - southern church) and the United Presbyterian Church in the United States of America (UPCUSA - northern church). The PC(USA) has always ordained women. With regards to its predecessor bodies - in 1893, Edith Livingston Peake was appointed Presbyterian Evangelist by First United Presbyterian of San Francisco. Between 1907 and 1920 five more women became ministers. The Presbyterian Church (USA) began ordaining women as elders in 1930, and as ministers of Word and sacrament in 1956. By 2001, the numbers of men and women holding office were almost equal. The first woman to be ordained in the Presbyterian Church in the United States (PCUS/Southern Church) was Rev. Rachel Henderlite who was ordained by a predominantly African American congregation in Richmond, VA in 1965. 
 The Presbyterian Church in America does not ordain women. In 1997, the PCA even broke its fraternal relationship with the Christian Reformed Church over this issue.
 The Reformed Church in the United States does not ordain women.
 The Free Reformed Churches of North America ordain men only.
 The Cumberland Presbyterian Church. In 1888 Louisa Woosley was licensed to preach. She was ordained in 1889. She wrote Shall Woman Preach.
 The Christian Reformed Church in North America began ordaining women in 1995. As a result, several conservative congregations formed the United Reformed Churches in North America, and the CRC's position as a member of the North American Presbyterian and Reformed Council (NAPARC) was suspended in 1997. Several individual congregations continue to oppose women's ordination and women are not seated at some Classes (regional assemblies).
 The Orthodox Presbyterian Church does not ordain women.
 The Reformed Church in America began allowing for the ordination of women in 1979.
 The United Church of Christ. Antoinette Brown was ordained as a minister by a Congregationalist Church in 1853, though this was not recognized by her denomination. She later became a Unitarian. The Christian Connection Church, which later merged with the Congregationalist Churches to form the Congregational Christian Church, ordained women as early as 1810.  Women's ordination is now non-controversial in the United Church of Christ.
 The Evangelical Covenant Order of Presbyterians (ECO) ordains women as both Teaching Elders (pastors) and Ruling Elders.
 The Evangelical Presbyterian Church (EPC) allows individual congregations to determine whether or not they ordain women.
 The Presbyterian Church in Canada began ordaining women as elders and as ministers in 1966.
 The United Church of Canada ordains women. The church was divided during the 1930s by this issue inherited from the churches it brought together, the United Church ordained its first woman minister, Reverend Lydia Emelie Gruchy, of Saskatchewan Conference in 1936. In 1953, Reverend Lydia Emelie Gruchy was the first Canadian woman to receive an honorary Doctor of Divinity.

Australia 
 The Uniting Church in Australia has ordained women since it formed in 1977. The three member denominations, the Congregational Union of Australia, the Methodist Church of Australasia and the Presbyterian Church of Australia had all ordained women prior to Union. The Congregational Union of Australia ordained the first woman in Christian ministry in Australia, Rev Winifred Kiek in 1927. The Methodist Church of Australasia first ordained women (Rev Margaret Sanders and Rev Coralie Ling) in 1969, while the Presbyterian Church of Australia ordained its first woman minister in 1974. After formation of the Uniting Church in Australia, the continuing Presbyterian Church of Australia reversed the decision to ordain women in 1991.
 The Presbyterian Church of Australia does not ordain women. As mentioned above some of its congregations left to join the new Uniting Church in 1977, 14 years later in 1991 it ceased ordaining women to the ministry, but the rights of women ordained prior to this time were not affected.

Pakistan 
 The Presbyterian Church of Pakistan ordains women.

Other Protestant
 The Religious Society of Friends (Quakers) do not ordain anyone but have had women in leadership roles such as Recorded Minister since they first started in 1652.  See Elizabeth Hooton and Mary Fisher It was longer before women held leadership roles in decision-making bodies that were historically exclusively men (e.g. Mary Jane Godlee was the first woman to clerk the London Yearly Meeting in 1918) - though the separate women's meetings did exercise significant authority.
 'Christian Connection Church: An early relative of the Christian Church (Disciples of Christ) and the United Church of Christ, this body ordained women as early as 1810. Among them were Nancy Gove Cram, who worked as a missionary with the Oneida Indians by 1812, and Abigail Roberts (a lay preacher and missionary), who helped establish many churches in New Jersey. Others included Ann Rexford, Sarah Hedges and Sally Thompson.
 The Christian and Missionary Alliance in the USA does not ordain women, but it does in other nations.  A female minister in Philippines, Ruth Tablada, has recently been ordained. The Christian and Missionary Alliance Church in Canada also ordains women.
 The Moravian Church ordains women.
 The Czechoslovak Hussite Church ordains women.
 The Seventh-day Adventist Church officially does not ordain women in most of the world, but in regions of the United States, the Netherlands, parts of Germany, and China may occasionally ordain women. These ordinations are considered irregular and are not officially recognized in the church yearbook. In some parts of the world the Adventist Church, commissions women instead of ordaining. They can perform almost the same duties as an ordained minister but do not hold the title of ordained. This is because recent votes at the worldwide General Conference Sessions turned down a proposal to allow ordination of women. There was a strong polarization between nations, with Western countries and North Asia Pacific generally voting in support and other countries generally voting against. A further proposal to allow local choice was also turned down. In practice, there are numerous women working as ministers and in leadership positions. The most influential co-founder of the church, Ellen G. White, was a woman, but never ordained.
 Churches of Christ, because of their conservative stance, generally do not ordain women.
The Christian Leaders Alliance allows women to serve as deacon ministers.

Women as Protestant bishops 

Some Protestant Churches, including those of the Lutheran, Hussite, Anglican, Methodist and Moravian traditions, have allowed women to become bishops:
 1924: Mount Sinai Holy Church of America- Ida B. Robinson served as founder and first presiding bishop 
 1929: Old Catholic Mariavite Church in Poland (and Catholic Mariavite Church, a 1935 schism from the Old Catholic Mariavite Church) – Maria Izabela Wiłucka-Kowalska and 11 nuns
 1980: United Methodist Church – Marjorie Matthews
 1988: Episcopal Church in the United States of America – Barbara Clementine Harris
 1990: Anglican Church of New Zealand – Penelope Ann Bansall Jamieson
 1990: Temple of The Good Shepherd Ministries Worldwide Inc. {Non Denominational} Eloisa Crawley Bonaparte 
 1992: North Elbian Evangelical Lutheran Church – Maria Jepsen
 1993: Church of Norway (Lutheran) – Rosemarie Köhn
 1993: Anglican Church of Canada – Victoria Matthews
 1995: Church of Denmark (Evangelical Lutheran) – Lise-Lotte Rebel
 1995: Church of Greenland - Sofie Petersen
 1996: Church of Sweden (Evangelical Lutheran) – Christina Odenberg
 1998: Moravian Church in America – Kay Ward
 1998: United Church of Christ in the Philippines – Nelinda Primavera-Briones
 1998: Presbyterian Church in Guatemala
 1999: Czechoslovak Hussite Church – Jana Šilerová
 1999: Evangelical Lutheran State Church of Hanover – Margot Käßmann
 2000: African Methodist Episcopal Church – Vashti Murphy McKenzie
 2001: Evangelical Church of Bremen – Brigitte Boehme, titled president, a laywoman since the presidency does not require theological skills 
 2001: North Elbian Evangelical Lutheran Church – Bärbel Wartenberg-Potter
 2003: The Lutheran Evangelical Protestant Church (GCEPC) USA – Nancy K. Drew
 2003: Church of Denmark (Evangelical Lutheran) - Elisabeth Dons Chritensen
 2007: Evangelical Lutheran Church in Canada – Susan Johnson
 2008: Anglican Church of Australia – Kay Goldsworthy
 2008: African Methodist Episcopal Zion Church – Mildred Hines
 2009: Evangelical Church in Central Germany – Ilse Junkermann
 2010: Evangelical Lutheran Church of Finland – Irja Askola
 2011: North Elbian Evangelical Lutheran Church – Kirsten Fehrs
 2011: Evangelical Church of Westphalia – Annette Kurschus, titled praeses
 2012: Church of Iceland (Lutheran) – Agnes M. Sigurðardóttir
 2012: Anglican Church of Southern Africa – Ellinah Wamukoya
 2012: Anglican Church of Southern Africa – Margaret Vertue
 2012: Church of Denmark – Tine Lindhardt
 2013: Church of Denmark – Marianne Christiansen
 2013: Church of Ireland (Anglican) – Pat Storey
 2013: Evangelical Lutheran Church of America – Elizabeth Eaton
 2014: Anglican Church in Aotearoa, New Zealand and Polynesia – Helen-Ann Hartley
 2015: Church of England – Libby Lane
 2015: Church of England – Alison White
 2015: Church of England – Rachel Treweek
 2015: Church of England – Sarah Mullally
 2015: Church of England – Anne Hollinghurst
 2015: Church of England – Ruth Worsley
 2015: Church of England – Christine Hardman
 2016: Church of England – Karen Gorham
 2016: Church of England – Jo Bailey Wells
 2016: Church of England – Jan McFarlane
 2017: Church of England – Guli Francis-Dehqani
 2017: Church in Wales – June Osborne
 2017: Church of Denmark - Marianne Gaarden
 2018: Scottish Episcopal Church – Anne Dyer
 2018: Church in Wales  – Joanna Penberthy 
 2019: Evangelical Church of Hesse Electorate-Waldeck – Beate Hofmann
 2019: Evangelical Lutheran Church in Northern Germany – Kristina Kühnbaum-Schmidt
 2020: Church of Greenland - Paneeraq Siegstad Munk
 2021: Evangelical Church of the Palatinate - Dorothee Wüst, titled president
 2021: Evangelical Reformed Church in Germany - Susanne Bei der Wieden, titled president
 2022: Protestant Church in Baden - Heike Springhart
 Others: Protestant churches in German Lutheran, Reformed and United churches (EKD), Protestant Church of the Netherlands

Women as archbishops or denominational heads 
 1934 Salvation Army – Evangeline Booth becomes General of The Salvation Army.
 1960 United Free Church of Scotland – Elizabeth Barr becomes Moderator of the General Assembly of the United Free Church of Scotland.
 2004 Church of Scotland – Dr. Alison Elliot becomes moderator of the General Assembly
 2005 Metropolitan Community Church – Nancy Wilson, first woman installed as moderator. 
 2006 The Episcopal Church—The Most Reverend Dr. Katharine Jefferts Schori. Installed as Presiding Bishop of the Episcopal Church and Primate (the same position which some other provinces in the Anglican Communion refer to as an Archbishop) at Washington National Cathedral on 4 November 2006, though she technically took office on the first of November.
2007 Evangelical Lutheran Church in Canada – Susan Johnson. First woman to serve as National Bishop of the ELCIC.  She was consecrated 29 September 2007. 
2008 The Wesleyan Church – Jo Anne Lyon. First woman to serve as a General Superintendent of the Wesleyan Church, and first to serve as the sole General Superintendent of the Wesleyan Church in its history.  She was elected in June 2008 and 2012 respectively.
 2013: Evangelical Lutheran Church of America – Elizabeth Eaton.  First women installed as Presiding Bishop.
 2014 Church of Sweden – Antje Jackelén Archbishop of Uppsala. Installed in Uppsala Cathedral on 15 June 2014.

References

Protestant
Protestant worship and liturgy